Fredrik Holmquist Bjerrehuus (born 14 January 1990) is a Danish Greco-Roman wrestler. He finished in fifth place at the 2019 World Wrestling Championships, thus qualifying for the 2020 Summer Olympics. He also finished fifth at the 2018 European Wrestling Championships, ninth at the 2015 European Games, and won five medals at the Nordic Wrestling Championships between 2012 and 2017.

References

External links
 
 
 

1990 births
Living people
People from Herning Municipality
Danish male sport wrestlers
Olympic wrestlers of Denmark
Wrestlers at the 2020 Summer Olympics
Wrestlers at the 2015 European Games
European Games competitors for Denmark
Sportspeople from the Central Denmark Region
20th-century Danish people
21st-century Danish people